The 2016 Horizon League women's basketball tournament was a postseason tournament from March 10 through March 13. For the first time every game will be available on an ESPN Network. Rounds 1 & 2 will be on ESPN3, with the semifinals on TWCS and simulcast on ESPN3. The championship will be on ESPNU. As a D2 to D1 transitioning school, Northern Kentucky were ineligible to compete in the NCAA tournament until the 2018 season, so they can not win the conference tournament since the winner received an automatic bid to the NCAA Tournament. However Northern Kentucky is eligible to win the regular season title and is eligible to compete in the WNIT or WBI should they be invited. The tournament champion will receive an automatic bid to the NCAA  women's tournament.

Seeds
All 10 Horizon League schools participate in the tournament. Teams are seeded by 2015–16 Horizon League season record. The top 6 teams received a first-round bye and top 2 teams will get a double bye.
Seeding for the tournament was determined at the close of the regular conference season:

Schedule

Tournament bracket
 

* - denotes overtime period

References

External links
 Horizon League Women's Basketball Tournament

Horizon League women's basketball tournament